The 1976–77 FIBA Korać Cup was the sixth edition of FIBA's new competition, running from 19 October 1976 to 5 April 1977. It was contested by 27 teams, three less than in the previous edition.

Jugoplastika defeated another one Italian club, Alco Bologna, and became the second back-to-back champion in this competition, after a single final that was held at Palasport della Fiera in Genova, Italy, on 5 April 1977. Alleging lack of sport and economic interest, the Spanish teams (FC Barcelona and Estudiantes Monteverde) eligible to participate in FIBA Korać Cup this season.

Season teams

First round

|}

Second round

|}

Automatically qualified to round of 12
 Jugoplastika (title holder)
 Dynamo Moscow

Round of 12

Semi finals

|}

Final
April 5, Palasport della Fiera, Genoa

|}

References
Linguasport 1976–77 FIBA Korać Cup
1976–77 FIBA Korać Cup

1976–77
1976–77 in European basketball